Southeast Louisiana National Wildlife Refuge Complex is a National Wildlife Refuge complex in the state of Louisiana.

Refuges within the complex
 Atchafalaya National Wildlife Refuge
 Bayou Sauvage National Wildlife Refuge
 Bayou Teche National Wildlife Refuge
 Big Branch Marsh National Wildlife Refuge
 Bogue Chitto National Wildlife Refuge
 Breton National Wildlife Refuge
 Delta National Wildlife Refuge
 Mandalay National Wildlife Refuge

References
Complex website

External links
 Friends of Louisiana Wildlife Refuges

National Wildlife Refuges in Louisiana